Maya Giri (born 1929), is a former athlete who competed for England.

Athletics career
She represented England in the discus at the 1958 British Empire and Commonwealth Games in Cardiff, Wales.

References

1929 births
English female discus throwers
Athletes (track and field) at the 1958 British Empire and Commonwealth Games
Possibly living people
Commonwealth Games competitors for England